Znamianskyi Raion was a raion (district) of Kirovohrad Oblast in central Ukraine. The administrative center of the raion was the city of Znamianka, which was incorporated separately as a city of oblast significance and did not belong to the raion. The raion was abolished on 18 July 2020 as part of the administrative reform of Ukraine, which reduced the number of raions of Kirovohrad Oblast to four. The area of Znamianka Raion was merged into Kropyvnytskyi Raion. The last estimate of the raion population was 

At the time of disestablishment, the raion consisted of two hromadas: 
 Dmytrivka rural hromada with the administration in the selo of Dmytrivka;
 Subottsi rural hromada with the administration in the selo of Subottsi.

References

Former raions of Kirovohrad Oblast
1923 establishments in Ukraine
Ukrainian raions abolished during the 2020 administrative reform